A constitutional referendum was held in Liechtenstein on 10 May 1981. Voters were asked whether they approved of amending article 46, which covered the number of seats in the Landtag, its membership and the electoral system. The proposal, which had been narrowly rejected in a 1975 referendum, was rejected by 52.9% of voters.

Results

References

1981 referendums
1981 in Liechtenstein
Referendums in Liechtenstein
Constitutional referendums
May 1981 events in Europe